The 1988–89 National Hurling League, known for sponsorship reasons as the Royal Liver National Hurling League, was the 58th season of the National Hurling League (NHL), an annual hurling competition for the GAA county teams. This season was notable as the first to hold both semi-finals and the final at Croke Park, giving the League additional prestige.

Division 1

Tipperary came into the season as defending champions of the 1987-88 season. Antrim and Offaly entered Division 1 as the two promoted teams.

On 30 April 1989, Galway won the title after a 2-16 to 4-8 win over Tipperary. It was their first league title since 1987 and their fifth National League title overall.

Waterford were the first team to be relegated after losing all of but one of their group stage games, while Offaly suffered the same fate after losing a series of play-off games with Antrim and Wexford.

Table

Group stage

Play-offs

Knock-out stage

Quarter-finals

Semi-finals

Final

Scoring statistics

Top scorers overall

Top scorers in a single game

Division 2

Clare, Cork, Derry and Meath entered Division 2 as the promoted and relegated teams from the previous season.

On 12 March 1989, Dublin secured the title following a 3-7 to 1-3 win over Cork in the final round of the group stage. Cork secured promotion to Division 1 as the second-placed team.

Kerry and Derry were relegated from Division 2.

Table

Group stage

Division 3

Down, Longford and Roscommon entered Division 3 as the promoted and relegated teams from the previous season.

On 12 March 1989, Down secured the title following a 7-5 to 1-9 win over Kildare in the final round of the group stage. Carlow secured promotion to Division 1 as the second-placed team.

Longford and Mayo were relegated from Division 3.

Table

Division 4

Tyrone entered Division 4 as the relegated team from the previous season.

On 7 May 1989, Monaghan secured the title following a 4-7 to 1-9 win over Louth in the league final.

Knock-out stage

Semi-finals

Final

References

National Hurling League seasons
League
League